Hannes Hlífar Stefánsson (born 18 July 1972) is an Icelandic chess grandmaster. He has won the Icelandic Chess Championship thirteen times, which makes him the record holder for most Icelandic Championship victories.

Chess career
Born in 1972, Hannes won the World U16 Chess Championship in 1987. He won the Acropolis International in 1993 He tied for first to third in the Reykjavik open in 1994, together with Pigusov and Zvjagintsev and tied for 1st–4th with Hedinn Steingrimsson, Yuriy Kryvoruchko and Mihail Marin in the Reykjavik Open tournament 2009. He won the International chess tournament Open Teplice 2015 in the Czech Republic. He is the No. 2 ranked Icelandic player as of September 2020.

References

External links
 

1972 births
Living people
Hannes Stefansson
Chess grandmasters
World Youth Chess Champions